Ludvig Cæsar Martin Aubert (30 March 1807 – 14 June 1887) was a Norwegian philologist.

Biography
Aubert was born in Christianssand (now Kristiansand), Norway. He was the son of Benoni Aubert (1768–1832) and Jakobine Henriette Thaulow  (1776–1833). His brother jurist Michael Conrad Sophus Emil Aubert (1811–1872) was County Governor of Nordre Bergenhus Amt (now Sogn og Fjordane).

Aubert was a professor of Latin philology at the Royal Frederick University from 1840 to 1875. His main work, Den latinske Verbalflexion, is largely obsolete.

Aubert and his wife Ida Dorothea Mariboe (1811–1900) were the parents of art educator and historian Fredrik Ludvig Andreas Vibe Aubert (1851–1913) and professor Ludvig Mariboe Benjamin Aubert (1838–1896).

References

1807 births
1887 deaths
People from Kristiansand
Norwegian philologists
Classical philologists
Norwegian Latinists
Academic staff of the University of Oslo
d'Aubert family